The India Tourism Development Corporation (ITDC) is a hospitality, retail and education company owned by the Government of India, under the administration of the Ministry of Tourism. Established in 1966, it owns over 17 properties under the Ashok Group of Hotels brand, across India.

One of the hotels the government developed was the Akbar Hotel in Chanakyapuri, which was built from 1965-69. It remained a hotel until the mid-1980's when it was converted into office space. There were plans in 2007 to convert it back into a hotel in time for the 2010 Commonwealth Games.

List of properties 
Properties that are operated by the ITDC in 2022 were: 

 Ashok Hotel
 Hotel Samrat 
 Kalinga Ashok
 Pondicherry Ashok

In 2011 ITDC owned hotels were:
 Hotel Patliputra Ashok, Patna, Bihar
 The Ashok, New Delhi, Delhi
 Samrat Hotel, New Delhi, Delhi
 Janpath Hotel, New Delhi, Delhi
 Hotel Jammu Ashok, Jammu, J&K
 Lalitha Mahal Palace Hotel, Mysore, Karnataka
 Hotel Kalinga Ashok, Bhubaneswar, Orissa
 Hotel Jaipur Ashok, Jaipur, Rajasthan

ITDC managed hotel:  
 Hotel Bharatpur Ashok, Bharatpur, Rajasthan 

ITDC Joint Venture hotels:  
 Hotel Lake View Ashok, Bhopal, Madhya Pradesh
 Hotel Brahmaputra Ashok, Guwahati, Assam
 Hotel Ranchi Ashok, Ranchi, Jharkhand
 Hotel Pondicherry Ashok, Pondicherry, Pondicherry
 Hotel Donyi Polo Ashok, Itanagar, Arunachal Pradesh
 Hotel Nilachal Ashok, Puri , Orissa 

Other former properties were: 
 Akbar Hotel 
 Halcyon Castle

References

External links

 ITDC at Ministry of Tourism

Ministry of Tourism (India)
Government-owned companies of India
Companies based in New Delhi
Transport companies established in 1966
Hospitality companies of India
1966 establishments in Delhi
Companies listed on the National Stock Exchange of India
Companies listed on the Bombay Stock Exchange